Kerrin Hayes is a former Australian rules footballer, who played for the Fitzroy Football Club in the Victorian Football League (VFL).

References

External links

1951 births
Living people
Fitzroy Football Club players
Port Fairy Football Club players
Australian rules footballers from Victoria (Australia)